Myra Ava Freeman  (born May 17, 1949) is a Canadian philanthropist, teacher, the 29th and first female Lieutenant Governor of Nova Scotia.

Freeman was born Myra Ava Holtzman in Saint John, New Brunswick, the daughter of Anne Golda (Freedman), a homemaker, and Harry Holtzman, a businessman. She graduated from Dalhousie University with a Bachelor of Arts and a Bachelor of Education. In 1971, she started teaching with the Halifax Regional School Board until her appointment.

She was appointed lieutenant governor in 2000 by Governor General Adrienne Clarkson, on the advice of Jean Chrétien. She served as lieutenant governor until September 7, 2006.

Freeman and her husband, Larry, have three children: Daniel M. Freeman, Jonathan Freeman and Debra Freeman.

In her childhood, Freeman was a member of the Girl Guides of Canada, participating in Guiding youth programs.

Honours

Honorary degrees

Honorary military appointments
  2003: Honorary Captain of Royal Canadian Navy Commander of Maritime Forces Atlantic.

Arms

References
 Past Lieutenant Governors of Nova Scotia. Government of Nova Scotia. Accessed 2010-12-22.

1949 births
Living people
Lieutenant Governors of Nova Scotia
Members of the Order of Nova Scotia
Politicians from Saint John, New Brunswick
People from Halifax, Nova Scotia
Dalhousie University alumni
Jewish Canadian politicians
Women in Nova Scotia politics
Canadian women viceroys
Jewish women politicians